Pop Culture Press is a music magazine founded in Memphis, Tennessee that covered the local Memphis underground scene as well as touring bands and underground music of the era. PCP, as it was known, moved to Austin, Texas in 1988.  PCP was made popular by its sampler CD, music from Cotton Mather, Spoon, The Wedding Present, They Might be Giants and others (see list below). Prior to that, the magazine offered free flexi-discs, which are now collectibles, featuring songs from The Dentists, Dream Syndicate, Elastica and many more.

Pop Culture Press was founded and edited by Luann Williams. Luke Torn, who has also written for The Wall Street Journal, Mojo, and The Austin Chronicle, took over as editor in 2005. There were sixty-six issues published, before it became a blog which eventually stopped updating in 2010. Some of the sampler CDs are now collector's items. Luann Williams revived the brand to create Pop Culture Press Records.  Pop Culture Press records has released two titles from LA indie band The Black Watch CD+LP: The End Of When (2013) and Sugarplum Fairy, Sugarplum Fairy (2015).

Bands on Pop Culture Press CD Samplers 

 Cotton Mather
 Spoon
 Magnapop
 Died Pretty
 The Dentists
 They Might Be Giants
 Kelly Willis
 Jimmy Eat World
 The Wedding Present
 Ass Ponys
 Tommy Keene
 Mark Eitzel
 Velocity Girl

References

External links
 Review of The Black Watch CD: The End of When
 Texas.gov
 Texas Monthly

1998 establishments in Tennessee
2010 disestablishments in Texas
American blogs
Defunct magazines published in the United States
Magazines established in 1998
Magazines disestablished in 2010
Magazines published in Austin, Texas
Magazines published in Tennessee
Mass media in Memphis, Tennessee
Music magazines published in the United States